Torin is a masculine given name which may refer to:

People:

Torin Dorn (born 1968), American former National Football League player
Torin Ferguson (born 1985), football goalkeeper from the Bahamas
Torin Francis (born 1983), American professional basketball player
Torin Koos (born 1980), American cross country skier
Torin Myhill (born 1995), Welsh rugby union player
Torin Thatcher (1905–1981), British actor
Torin Yater-Wallace (born 1995), American freestyle skier

Fictional characters:
 Torin Mac Quillon, protagonist of the American comic book series Starslayer
 Torin, in the Japanese television series Zyuden Sentai Kyoryuger

See also

Tonin (name)
 Torrin Lawrence (1989-2014), American sprinter
 Torrin Tucker (born 1979), American former National Football League player

Masculine given names